The Barclays Arena (originally known as the Color Line Arena and formerly known as barclaycard arena and O2 World Hamburg) is a multipurpose arena in Hamburg, Germany. It opened in 2002 and can hold up to 16,000 people (13,800 or 12,947 for sporting events). It is located at Altona Volkspark, adjacent to the football stadium Volksparkstadion and the Volksbank Arena in Hamburg's western Bahrenfeld district.

The arena is primarily used for pop/rock concerts and was the home of handball club HSV Hamburg and  ice hockey team Hamburg Freezers until both teams folded in 2016. The Barclaycard Arena is among the most modern venues in Europe.

History 

The arena opened in November 2002, is 150 meters long and 110 metres wide and has an elevation of 33 metres. Construction costs totaled approximately 83 million Euro (ca. US$121.5mn). The construction was funded by the Finnish entrepreneur Harry Harkimo and the city of Hamburg, who sold Harkimo the land for a symbolic price of one Mark and also financed infrastructure improvements with 12 million Marks (about 6.1 million euros) as a preparatory measure. In October 2007 the arena was sold to Anschutz Entertainment Group for an estimated 75 million Euros. Anschutz Entertainment Group is a subsidiary of the Anschutz Corporation, one of the world’s leading sports and entertainment presenters.

Naming rights 

The arena was initially named after Norwegian ferry operator Color Line as the "Color Line Arena". In 2010 the sponsor changed to Spanish telecommunications company Telefónica, naming the arena as "O2 World Hamburg". O2 sponsorship ceased in summer 2015, changing the arena name again, this time into "barclaycard arena".

In June 2021 and because of Barclaycard's rebranding in Germany to the bank's corporate name, the arena announced that from autumn 2021 onwards, the name will change once more to Barclays Arena (stylized as BARCLAYS Arena).

Concerts
 On 21 April 2022, Simple Minds performed at the arena as part of their "40 Years of Hits" tour.
 On 9 May 2022, Dua Lipa performed a sold out show at the arena as part of her Future Nostalgia Tour.
 On 1, 2 & 24 February 2023, British singer Robbie Williams will perform at the arena as part of the European leg of his XXV Tour.
 On 24 April 2023, Swedish metal band Sabaton will perform at the arena as part of their The Tour To End All Tours tour.
 On 31 March 2024, Canadian singer Celine Dion will perform at the arena as part of her Courage World Tour.

See also
List of indoor arenas in Germany
List of European ice hockey arenas

References

External links

 
Pictures of the O2 World Hamburg

Basketball venues in Germany
Handball venues in Germany
Indoor arenas in Germany
Indoor ice hockey venues in Germany
Sports venues in Hamburg
Buildings and structures in Altona, Hamburg
Sports venues completed in 2002
Event venues established in 2002
2002 establishments in Germany